Bruno de Jesus Pacheco (born 8 December 1991), known as Bruno Pacheco, is a Brazilian footballer who plays as left back for Fortaleza.

He was known as Tatá in the beginning of his career.

Career statistics

Honours
Ceará
Copa do Nordeste: 2020

References

External links

1991 births
Living people
People from Pirassununga
Brazilian footballers
Association football defenders
Campeonato Brasileiro Série A players
Campeonato Brasileiro Série B players
Campeonato Brasileiro Série C players
Associação Ferroviária de Esportes players
Ivinhema Futebol Clube players
Associação Atlética Internacional (Limeira) players
Esporte Clube São Bento players
Ipatinga Futebol Clube players
Guarani FC players
Clube Atlético Bragantino players
Atlético Clube Goianiense players
Associação Chapecoense de Futebol players
Ceará Sporting Club players
Fortaleza Esporte Clube players
Footballers from São Paulo (state)